Prabhakar Raghavan is a senior vice president at Google, where he is responsible for Google Search, Assistant, Geo, Ads, Commerce, and Payments products. His research spans algorithms, web search and databases and he is the co-author of the textbooks Randomized Algorithms with Rajeev Motwani and Introduction to Information Retrieval.

Early life and education
Prabhakar's mother, Amba Raghavan, taught physics and math at St Joseph's Convent School, Bhopal and St Patricks High School, Adyar, Chennai after earning a master's degree from Presidency College, Chennai.
Prabhakar himself holds a Bachelor of Technology from the Indian Institute of Technology Madras and a Ph.D. from the University of California, Berkeley in Electrical Engineering and Computer Science. He did his schooling from Campion School, Bhopal.

Career
Prior to joining Google, he worked at Yahoo! Labs. Before that, Prabhakar worked at IBM Research  and later became senior vice president and chief technology officer at enterprise search vendor Verity.

Awards and honors
Prabhakar is a member of the National Academy of Engineering and a Fellow of both the Association for Computing Machinery and the Institute of Electrical and Electronics Engineers (IEEE).  From 2003 to 2009, Prabhakar was the editor-in-chief of Journal of the ACM.

In 1986, Prabhakar received the Machtey Award for Best Student Paper. In 2000, he was named a fellow of the IEEE; received the Best Paper Award at the ACM Symposium on Principles of Database Systems; and received the Best Paper Award at the Ninth International World Wide Web Conference (WWW9). In 2002, Prabhakar was named a fellow of the ACM. He received the 2006 Distinguished Alumnus Award, UC Berkeley Division of Computer Science. In 2008, Prabhakar was made a member of the National Academy of Engineering, and in 2009, he was awarded a Laurea honoris causa from the University of Bologna. In 2012 he was named a Distinguished Alumnus by the IIT Madras. In 2017 Prabhakar and co-authors received the Seoul test of time award for their 2000 paper “Graph Structure in the Web” at the WWW conference.

References

Yahoo! employees
IBM employees
American chief executives
American computer businesspeople
American computer scientists
Living people
University of California, Berkeley alumni
1960 births
Members of the United States National Academy of Engineering
Indian emigrants to the United States
Indian computer scientists
20th-century Indian mathematicians
IIT Madras alumni
Google employees